KZCZ-LD, virtual channel 34 (UHF digital channel 20), is a low-powered The Country Network-affiliated television station licensed to College Station, Texas, United States. The station is owned by the DTV America Corporation.

History 
On October 2, 2012, the station's construction permit was issued to DTV America, but the station had the callsign of K34MN-D. The current KZCZ-LD call letters were adopted on March 11, 2013. The station remained silent until September 12, 2016, when its first four subchannels were affiliated with Bounce TV, Laff, Grit, and Escape (now Ion Mystery) respectively.

Digital channels
The station's digital signal is multiplexed:

References

External links

DTV America
Bounce TV

Innovate Corp.
Bounce TV affiliates
Laff (TV network) affiliates
Grit (TV network) affiliates
Ion Mystery affiliates
Buzzr affiliates
Television stations in Texas
Television channels and stations established in 2016
Low-power television stations in the United States
2016 establishments in Texas